Pájaro may refer to:

Places
 Pájaros, a district of Puerto Rico
 Pajaro, California, a census-designated place in Monterey County, California
 Pajaro Dunes, California, a census-designated place in Santa Cruz County, California
 Pajaro River, a river in California
 El Pájaro, a corregimiento in Panama

People
 Pájaro (artist) (born 1952), Venezuelan painter 
 Nahuel Pájaro (born 1997), Argentine footballer  
 Pablo Sánchez Pájaro (born 1990), Mexican  football (soccer) player

See also
 Pajarito Mesa, New Mexico, a Census-designated place in Bernalillo County, New Mexico (Little bird Mesa)
 
 Pajaro Valley Historical Association, a historical association of Pajaro Valley in Central California
 Pajaro Valley Unified School District, a school district in Watsonville, California